The Herrmann Brain Dominance Instrument (HBDI) is a system to measure and describe thinking preferences in people, developed by William "Ned" Herrmann while leading management education at General Electric's Crotonville facility. It is a type of cognitive style measurement and model, and is often compared to psychological assessments such as the Myers-Briggs Type Indicator, Learning Orientation Questionnaire, DISC assessment, and others.

Brain dominance model
In his brain dominance model, Herrmann identifies four different modes of thinking:

A. Analytical thinking 
Key words: logical, factual, critical, technical, quantitative.
Preferred activities: collecting data, analysis, understanding how things work, judging ideas based on facts, criteria and logical reasoning.
 
B. Sequential thinking
Key words: safekeeping, structured, organized, complexity or detailed, planned.
Preferred activities: following directions, detail-oriented work, step-by-step problem solving, organization, implementation.

C. Interpersonal thinking 
Key words: kinesthetic, emotional, spiritual, sensory, feeling.
Preferred activities: listening to and expressing ideas, looking for personal meaning, sensory input, group interaction.

D. Imaginative thinking
Key words: visual, holistic, intuitive, innovative, conceptual.
Preferred activities: looking at the big picture, taking initiative, challenging assumptions, visuals, metaphoric thinking, creative problem solving, long-term thinking.

His theory was based on theories of the modularity of cognitive functions, including well-documented specializations in the brain's cerebral cortex and limbic systems, and the research into left-right brain lateralization by Roger Wolcott Sperry, Robert Ornstein, Henry Mintzberg, and Michael Gazzaniga. These theories were further developed to reflect a metaphor for how individuals think and learn. Use of that metaphor brought later criticism by brain researchers such as Terence Hines for being overly simplistic, though advocates argue that the metaphorical construct has been beneficial in organizational contexts including business and government.

Herrmann also coined the concept Whole Brain Thinking as a description of flexibility in using thinking styles that one may cultivate in individuals or in organizations allowing the situational use of all four styles of thinking.

The Herrmann Brain Dominance Instrument
The format of the instrument is a 116-question online assessment, which determines the degree of preference for each of the model's four styles of thinking. More than one style may be dominant (or a primary preference) at once in this model. For example, in Herrmann's presentation a person may have strong preferences in both analytical and sequential styles of thinking but lesser preferences in interpersonal or imaginative modes, though he asserts all people use all styles to varying degrees.

A 1985 dissertation by C. Bunderson, currently CEO of the non-profit EduMetrics Institute  asserts that "four stable, discrete clusters of preference exist", "scores derived from the instrument are valid indicators of the four clusters", and "The scores permit valid inferences about a person's preferences and avoidances for each of these clusters of mental activity".

Consulting and training
Based on the HBDI Assessment and Whole Brain model, Herrmann International and its global affiliates offer consulting and solutions (including workshops, programs, books and games) to improve personal or group communication, creativity, and other benefits.

Critiques

Self reporting
Measurements that require people to state preferences between terms have received criticism. Researchers C. W. Allinson and J. Hayes, in their own 1996 publication of a competing cognitive style indicator called Cognitive Style Index in the peer reviewed Journal of Management Studies, noted that "there appears to be little or no published independent evaluation of several self-report measures developed as management training tools. [including] Herrmann Brain Dominance Instrument."

However, some find usefulness in self reporting measurements. Researchers G.P. Hodgkinson and E. Sadler-Smith in 2003 found cognitive style indicators generally useful for studying organizations. However, in a critique of the Cognitive Style Index indicator they opined that progress in the field had been "hampered by a proliferation of alternative constructs and assessment instruments" many unreliable with a lack of agreement over nomenclature.

To measure self-report consistency, a differential item functioning review of HBDI was published in 2007 by Jared Lees. However, his tests were supported by EduMetrics, a company on contract with Herrmann International to evaluate the system, and were therefore not completely independent.

Lateralization
Herrmann International describes an underlying basis for HBDI in the lateralization of brain function theory championed by Gazzaniga and others that associates each of the four thinking styles with a particular locus in the human brain. Analytical and sequential styles are associated with left brain and interpersonal and imaginative styles are associated with right brain, for example. Ned Herrmann described dominance of a particular thinking style with dominance with a portion of a brain hemisphere.

The notion of hemisphere dominance attracted some criticism from the neuroscience community, notably by Terence Hines who called it "pop psychology" based on unpublished EEG data. He asserts that current literature instead found that both hemispheres are always involved in cognitive tasks and attempting to strengthen a specific hemisphere does not improve creativity, for example. Hines stated "No evidence is presented to show that these 'brain dominance measures' measure anything related to the differences between the two hemispheres. In other words, no evidence of validity [of hemisphere dominance] is presented.".

Creativity
Herrmann offered creativity workshops based on leveraging all the quadrants within the Whole Brain Model, rather than focusing on physiological attributes. strengthening particular thinking styles and strengthening the right hemisphere, which received critiques that creativity is not localized to a particular thinking style nor to a particular hemisphere.

A study published in the peer reviewed Creativity Research Journal in 2005 by J. Meneely and M. Portillo agreed that creativity is not localized into a particular thinking style, such as a right-brain dominance resulting in more creativity. They did however find correlation between creativity in design students based on how flexible they were using all four thinking styles equally as measured by the HBDI. When students were less entrenched in a specific style of thinking they measured higher creativity using Domino's Creativity Scale (ACL-Cr).

References 

 Allinson, C.W., & Hayes, J. (1996) 'Cognitive Style Index: A measure of intuition-analysis for organizational research', Journal of Management Studies, 33:1 January 1996
 Bentley, Joanne and Hall, Pamela (2001) Learning Orientation Questionnaire correlation with the Herrmann Brain Dominance Instrument: A validity study Dissertation Abstracts International Section A: Humanities and Social Sciences, Vol 61(10-A), Apr 2001. pp. 3961.
 Deardorff, Dale S. (2005) An exploratory case study of leadership influences on innovative culture: A descriptive study Dissertation Abstracts International: Section B: The Sciences and Engineering, Vol 66(4-B), 2005. pp. 2338.
 DeWald, R. E. (1989). Relationships of MBTI types and HBDI preferences in a population of student program managers (Doctoral dissertation, Western Michigan University, 1989). Dissertation Abstracts International, 50(06), 2657B. (University Microfilms No. AAC89-21867)
 Herrmann, Ned (1999) The Theory Behind the HBDI and Whole Brain Technology pdf 
 Hines, Terence (1991) 'The myth of right hemisphere creativity.' Journal of Creative Behavior, Vol 25(3), 1991. pp. 223–227.
 Hines, Terence (1987) 'Left Brain/Right Brain Mythology and Implications for Management and Training', The Academy of Management Review, Vol. 12, No. 4, October 1987
 Hines, Terence (1985) 'Left brain, right brain: Who's on first?' Training & Development Journal, Vol 39(11), Nov 1985. pp. 32–34. [Journal Article]
 Hodgkinson, Gerard P., and Sadler-Smith, Eugene (2003) Complex or unitary? A critique and empirical re-assessment of the Allinson-Hayes Cognitive Style Index., Journal of Occupational and Organizational Psychology, 09631798, 20030601, Vol. 76, Issue 2
 Holland, Paul W. and Wainer, Howard (1993) Differential Item Functioning 
 Krause, M. G. (1987, June). A comparison of the MBTI and the Herrmann Participant Survey. Handout from presentation at APT-VII, the Seventh Biennial International Conference of the Association for Psychological Type, Gainesville, FL.
 Lees, Jared A. (2007) Differential Item Functioning Analysis of the Herrmann Brain Dominance Instrument Masters Thesis, Brigham Young University - on ScholarsArchive
 McKean, K. (1985) 'Of two minds: Selling the right brain.', Discover, 6(4), pp. 30–41.
 Meneely, Jason; and Portillo, Margaret; (2005) The Adaptable Mind in Design: Relating Personality, Cognitive Style, and Creative Performance. Creativity Research Journal, Vol 17(2-3), 2005. pp. 155–166. [Journal Article]
 Wilson, Dennis H. (2007) A comparison of the Herrmann Brain Dominance Instrument(TM) and the extended DISCMRTM behavior profiling tool: An attempt to create a more discerning management perspective. Dissertation Abstracts International Section A: Humanities and Social Sciences, Vol 68(3-A). pp. 1079.

Further reading
 Ned Herrmann (1990) The Creative Brain, Brain Books, Lake Lure, North Carolina. . .
 Ned Herrmann (1996) The Whole Brain Business Book, McGraw-Hill, New York, NY. . .
 Giannini, John L. (1984) Compass of the Soul: Archetypal Guides to a Fuller Life. . .
 Edward Lumsdaine, M. Lumsdaine (1994) Creative Problem Solving, McGraw-Hill . .
 Peter Ferdinand Drucker, David Garvin, Dorothy Leonard, Susan Straus, and John Seely Brown. (1998). Harvard Business Review on Knowledge Management.  Harvard Business School Press . .
 Sala, Sergio Della, Editor (1999). Mind Myths: Exploring Popular Assumptions About the Mind and Brain, J. Wiley & Sons, New York. . .

Human resource management